StereoHeroes is a French electronic music duo, composed of Fabrice Delcambre and Sébastien Plé.

Biography 
StereoHeroes was formed in 2008 in the south of France. Quickly noticed by all the major international blogs, their first tracks, freely distributed, gave them an instant popularity around the world. They started then a never ending tour which took them in almost thirty countries. Their first official EP Boom Slang was released in 2009 on Leonizer Records, the label founded by Leonard de Leonard. It's followed in 2011 by Exiles on German label Freakz Me Out, and in 2012, by Deviations Vol.1 an EP exploring different musical territories and which will be followed by two other volumes in 2013. In the meantime, they released their third official EP, 8Ball, on Steve Aoki's Dim Mak Records. On the fringe of their commercial releases, StereoHeroes keep giving away original productions and remixes for free on a regular basis.

Key moments 
 2009 : Their remix of the track Kick It by Zingone & Nina Martine is used for the season 5 of So You Think You Can Dance.
 2009 : Their track Lamborghini Lungz with South African rapper Spoek Mathambo and American Cerebral Vortex is selected by Diesel for their compilation Edges - A New French Electronic Generation amongst artists like Breakbot, Danger, Djedjotronic, Anoraak, among others.
 2012 StereoHeroes signs at the same time on Om Records and Dim Mak Records for several EPs.

Tour 
Since 2008, StereoHeroes played in the following countries : South Africa, Germany, England, Australia, Austria, Belgium, Canada, South Korea, Spain, France, Netherlands, Hong Kong, Indonesia, Italia, Japan, Malaysia, Mexico, Norway, Poland, Portugal, Russia, Sweden, Switzerland, Taiwan, Thailand, Vietnam.

Support 
StereoHeroes received support from Tiësto.

Anecdotes 
 All the tracks, EPs and mixtapes from StereoHeroes are named after comics characters or teams and organizations from Marvel Universe.

Discography

Singles and EP

Boom Slang EP
Leonizer Records (2009)
 Boom Slang
 Boom Slang (StereoHeroes 2009 Remix)
 Booby Trap
 Fukt (2009 Radio Reedit feat. Teen Wolf
 Fever Pitch (Vocal Mix feat. Little Prince)
 Boom Slang (Mixhell Remix)
 Boom Slang (Rayflash Remix)
 Fever Pitch

The Lost Generation
Free release (2010)
 "Effigy"
 "Pixie"

Exiles
Freakz Me Out (2011)
 Wild Child
 Wild Child (Le Castle Vania Remix)
 Night Hawk
 Longshot (John Lord Fonda 'Hard Disco' Remix)
 Longshot
 Night Hawk (Blatta & Inesha Remix)
 Wild Child (Dub Version)

Deviations Vol.1
Om Records (2012)
 Blackbot
 Numbers
 Waxworks

8 Ball EP
Dim Mak Records (2012)
 Crystal
 Polaris

New Noise Vol.4
Dim Mak Records (2013)
 Storm

Deviations Vol.2
Free release (2013)
 Sunspot
 Mercury

Remixes

Unreleased and free tracks 
 StereoHeroes - Ammo (Original Mix)
 M.I.A.- Bad Girls (StereoHeroes ‘BattleSheep’ Edit)
 The Offspring - Come out and play (StereoHeroes remix)
 Djedjotronic feat. Spoek - Dirty & Hard (StereoHeroes remix)
 Far East Movement - Boomshake (StereoHeroes Remix)
 StereoHeroes feat. Mic Terror - Juke dem hoes
 StereoHeroes - Blackout
 StereoHeroes - Fin Fang Foom
 StereoHeroes - Washout
 StereoHeroes - Action Pack (Original instrumental)
 StereoHeroes feat. Da Chick - Action Pack (Laser trip)
 StereoHeroes - Moon Knight
 StereoHeroes feat. Teen Wolf - Midnight Sons
 StereoHeroes - Black Lama
 Emmanuel Top - Acid Phase (StereoHeroes ‘21st Century’ Edit)

Mixtapes
 2008 : NLLR Mixtape 036 by StereoHeroes
 2008 : StereoHeroes exclusive mixtape for Sick & Spinning
 2009 : StereoHeroes - Project Wideawake (Mixtape)
 2010 : StereoHeroes - Action Pack (The Mixtape)
 2010 : StereoHeroes exclusive mini mix for Cyberpunkers Flash in Punk Radio show
 2010 : StereoHeroes - Burn Paris Burn # 7 ("Bye Bye Violence")
 2011 : StereoHeroes - The Conspiracy (Mixtape)
 2012 : StereoHeroes - The Order (Mixtape)
 2012 : StereoHeroes - Deviations (The Mixtapes) #1
 2013 : StereoHeroes - The Called (Metrojolt.com guest mix) 
 2013 : StereoHeroes Exclusive Minimix for the Cheap Lettus Show (Australia)
 2013 : StereoHeroes - Crushes Sessions #1
 2014 : StereoHeroes - Crushes Sessions #2
 2014 : StereoHeroes - Crushes Sessions #3

Notes and references

External links 
 
 StereoHeroes on Soundcloud
 StereoHeroes on Top Deejays

Musical groups established in 2008
French electronic music groups
French dance music groups
French musical duos
French DJs
Club DJs
Remixers
Electronic music duos
Electronic dance music DJs